Mikhaylovsky District is an administrative district (raion), one of the thirty-three in Volgograd Oblast, Russia. As a municipal division, it is a part of Mikhaylovka Urban Okrug. It is located in the northwestern central part of the oblast. Its administrative center is the town of Mikhaylovka (which is not administratively a part of the district). Population:  25,978 (2002 Census);

Administrative and municipal status
Within the framework of administrative divisions, Mikhaylovsky District is one of the thirty-three in the oblast. The town of Mikhaylovka serves as its administrative center, despite being incorporated separately as a town of oblast significance—an administrative unit with the status equal to that of the districts.

As a municipal division, the territory of the administrative district and the territory of the town of oblast significance of Mikhaylovka are incorporated together as Mikhaylovka Urban Okrug. The district used to be incorporated as Mikhaylovsky Municipal District, but effective July 10, 2012, the municipal district was merged into Mikhaylovka Urban Okrug and abolished.

References

Notes

Sources

Districts of Volgograd Oblast

